This is a timeline of the Jin dynasty (266–420) and the Sixteen Kingdoms (304–439).

260s

280s

290s

300s

310s

320s

330s

340s

350s

360s

370s

380s

390s

400s

410s

420s

430s

Gallery

References

Bibliography

 

Jin
Timelines of Chinese eras and periods